The Shops Act 1950 was an Act of Parliament of the United Kingdom which was repealed on 1 December 1994 by the Deregulation and Contracting Out Act 1994. The introductory text describes it as "An Act to consolidate the Shops Acts, 1912 to 1938, and certain other enactments relating to shops.".

The Act dealt with hours of closing (not hours of opening), half-day holidays, employment conditions and with Sunday trading in England and Wales.

Extent
The Act did not extend to Northern Ireland.

Part IV of the Act (Sunday Closing) did not extend to Scotland.

Exemptions 
The Shops (Airports) Act 1962 is an Act of Parliament which makes exemptions of the Shops Act 1950 for traders conducting business in airports. These exemptions apply to shops that are in airports, other than those not ordinarily accessible by those travelling to or from the airport by air, and exempts them from the provisions in Part 1 of the Shops Act 1950 regarding closing times. The Act was later repealed by the Deregulation and Contracting Out Act 1994 alongside the Shops Act 1950.

Repeals
The following Acts were entirely repealed by this Act:
Shops Act 1912
Shops Act 1913
Shops (Hours of Closing) Act 1928
Hairdressers' and Barbers' Shops (Sunday Closing) Act 1930
Shops Act 1934
Shops Act 1936
Retail Meat Dealers' Shops (Sunday Closing) Act 1936
Shops (Sunday Trading Restriction) Act 1936

The following Acts were partially repealed by this Act:

 Factories Act 1937 (in section ninety-eight, subsection (6))
 Young Persons (Employment) Act 1938 (Sections eight, eleven, twelve and thirteen)
 National Health Service Act 1946 (In the Tenth Schedule, the amendments of the Shops (Sunday Trading Restriction) Act 1936)

References

United Kingdom Acts of Parliament 1950